Sergio Insunza Barrios (May 5, 1919 – July 19, 2014) was a Chilean lawyer, politician and human rights activist. He served as the last Minister of Justice within the government of President Salvador Allende from November 2, 1972, until September 11, 1973. His tenure as Justice Minister ended with the 1973 Chilean coup d'état and overthrow of President Allende om September 11, 1973.

Insunza died on July 19, 2014, at the age of 94.

References

1919 births
2014 deaths
Chilean Ministers of Justice
University of Chile alumni